Tuas West Road MRT station is an above-ground Mass Rapid Transit (MRT) station along the East West line in Tuas, Singapore. This station took its name from a nearby road. It is located along Pioneer Road, near the junction with Tuas West Road, and sits along the boundaries of the Tuas North, Tuas Bay and Tuas Promenade planning subzones.

The station serves industries in the vicinity of Pioneer Road and Tuas West Road, such as Tuas Avenue 9, 11, 12 and 20, Tuas Lane and Tuas West Avenue.

History

It was first announced on 11 January 2011 by Transport Minister Mr Raymond Lim in a speech while visiting Bedok when new platform screen doors opened there. It was expected to be completed by 2016 and would benefit an estimated 100,000 commuters daily. 
The opening of the station was delayed from 2016 to the second quarter of 2017 to make way for the installation of the new signalling system. It entered operations on 18 June 2017. 

Stations between Gul Circle to Tuas Link were temporary closed between 16 and 19 November 2017 following a collision incident that happened between Joo Koon and Gul Circle. On 20 November 2017, train service from Gul Circle to Tuas Link was resumed; however, train services between Joo Koon and Gul Circle will be suspended till mid-2018 to facilitate maintenance work on signalling devices.

References

External links
 Station information

Railway stations in Singapore opened in 2017
Mass Rapid Transit (Singapore) stations